The Independence Mountains are a mountain range in northern Elko County, Nevada, United States. They are called Settoya in Shoshoni. To the east is the North Fork of the Humboldt River, and to the west is the Owyhee Desert. Passing to the south is the main branch of the Humboldt River, and near the northern end of the range is the Wild Horse State Recreation Area. The Owyhee River is tributary to the Snake-Columbia system, while the Humboldt is within the Great Basin.

The range then drops nearly to the level of the surrounding valleys, at a pass where State Route 226 connects to the community of Tuscarora.

Rising sharply to the main core of the range, the crest runs through Wheeler Mountain, Jack's Peak, and finally to the range high point, McAfee Peak.

Most of the range north of State Route 226 is included within the Mountain City Ranger District of the Humboldt-Toiyabe National Forest.

References

External link

Mountain ranges of the Great Basin
Mountain ranges of Elko County, Nevada
Humboldt–Toiyabe National Forest
Humboldt River
Mountain ranges of Nevada